The Embraer EMB-505 Phenom 300 is a single-pilot-certified light business jet developed by the Brazilian aerospace manufacturer Embraer. It can carry up to 11 occupants.

Development

Embraer began designing the Phenom 300 after finding that potential customers of the Phenom 100 would also like a bigger aircraft. It was a new design with the aim of allowing operation to smaller airports such as London City and Telluride Regional Airport.

It first flew on 29 April 2008, and received its type certification on 3 December 2009. On 29 December 2009 Embraer delivered the first Phenom 300 to Executive Flight Services at the company's headquarters at São José dos Campos, Brazil.

In 2022, its equipped price was $10.295M.

Design

The Phenom 300 is a twin-engined cantilever monoplane with low-positioned, swept wings. It has a horizontal stabiliser in a T-tail configuration and a retractable tricycle landing gear. It has two rear-pylon-mounted Pratt & Whitney Canada PW535E turbofan engines. The enclosed cabin has room for nine passengers and a two-pilot crew; during single-pilot operation an additional passenger can be carried. Access to the cockpit and cabin is via an airstair on the left-hand side.

Its structural life is 28,000 flight cycles or 35,000 hours. It is built of 18% composite materials; it has winglets, but not thrust reversers. The Phenom 300 has single-point refueling and an externally serviced private rear lavatory.

Variants
 
Phenom 300
 Original EMB-505, produced since 2009.

Phenom 300E
 In 2018, Embraer has launched upgraded Phenom 300E, featuring redesigned interior, new avionics suite (Garmin-G3000-based Prodigy Touch), and Ground Power Mode for engines.

2020 Phenom 300E
 In 2020, an upgraded Phenom 300E was announced, featuring upgraded PW535E1 engines, with thrust increased to 3,478 lbf (from 3,360 lbf); maximum speed has increased to Mach 0.80 from 0.78 (464 vs. 446 kn), and range increased to 2,010 nmi (from 1,992 nmi). Avionics improvements include predictive wind shear awareness, stabilized approach, and an Embraer-developed runway overrun awareness and alerting system (ROAAS). In addition, Bossa Nova interior option became available.

2020 Phenom 300MED
 In August of 2020, a ready-fit medevac configuration became available for new Phenom 300 aircraft, known as Phenom 300MED. This program also allows existing Phenom 300 aircraft a retrofit option to a medevac interior.

Operators

Aircraft deliveries
In 2013, the Phenom 300 was the most delivered business jet, with 60 units. It also led the industry in deliveries in 2014 and 2015.

After July 2016, all Phenom assembly was moved to the Melbourne, Florida line, which has the capability to assemble 96 Phenoms and 72 Embraer Legacy 450/Embraer Legacy 500s annually. More than 170 Phenom jets had been produced at the site by June 2016, mainly for the US market.

In March 2019, Embraer delivered the 500th Phenom 300, claiming more than half of the light jet market share since 2012. It was being used in over 30 countries and had carried 2.5 million passengers in 600,000 flights and 800,000 hours.
The 600th unit was delivered in May 2021.

Accidents and incidents
As of January 2023, the Phenom 300 has been involved in three hull-loss accidents causing five fatalities.

 On 31 July 2015, a Phenom 300, aircraft registration HZ-IBN, crashed into a car park  whilst trying to land at Blackbushe Airport in Hampshire. All four persons on board the Saudi-registered private jet died in the crash and subsequent fire. 
 On 2 January 2023, Phenom 300 N555NR crashed shortly after takeoff on the grounds of Provo Municipal Airport in Utah. The pilot was killed, one passenger was critically injured, and the two other passengers received minor injuries. The cause of the crash is under investigation.

Specifications (2020 Phenom 300E)

See also

References

External links

 
 

2000s Brazilian business aircraft
Embraer aircraft
T-tail aircraft
Low-wing aircraft
Twinjets
Aircraft first flown in 2008